was a Japanese sprinter. He competed in the men's 100 metres at the 1928 Summer Olympics. He served during World War II, and died in New Bilibid prison camp after the war from malaria.

References

External links
 

1906 births
1945 deaths
Japanese male sprinters
Olympic male sprinters
Olympic athletes of Japan
Athletes (track and field) at the 1928 Summer Olympics
Japan Championships in Athletics winners
Japanese military personnel killed in World War II
Japanese prisoners of war
Deaths from malaria
Infectious disease deaths in the Philippines
Japanese people who died in prison custody
Prisoners who died in United States military detention
Imperial Japanese Army personnel of World War II
Kyoto University alumni
World War II prisoners of war held by the United States
20th-century Japanese people